Castle Hot Springs may refer to:

 Castle Hot Springs, more commonly known as Castle Rock Springs, California (among other names), an unincorporated community in Lake County, California
 Castle Hot Springs (Arizona), a historic resort in Arizona, located in the Hieroglyphic Mountains, north of Phoenix